T&R Theakston is a brewery in the market town of Masham, North Yorkshire, England. The company is the sixteenth largest brewer in the UK by market share, and the second largest brewer under family ownership after Shepherd Neame. Its best known beer is Old Peculier.

The brewery is also one of the last remaining in the UK to have an in-house cooperage.

History

T&R Theakston Ltd. was founded in 1827 by Robert Theakston and John Wood at the Black Bull pub and brewhouse in College Lane, Masham. By 1832, Theakston had sole ownership of the brewery and in 1875 he passed control over to his sons Thomas and Robert. Thomas and Robert Theakston formed the T&R Theakston partnership and constructed a new brewery on the Paradise Fields, a stone's throw away from the original site.

In 1919, the company acquired the Lightfoot Brewery, also in Masham, now used as the company's flagship hotel, The White Bear.

Through successive generations the business became the established brewer in North Yorkshire being well placed to take advantage of the consumer boom in interest in cask ale in the 1960s. Demand for Theakston beers grew rapidly, putting capacity pressure on the Masham brewery, a challenge met with the purchase of the Carlisle State Management Brewery enabling expansion into Cumbria and the North East of England  The Carlisle Brewery had been owned and operated by the government since 1916. However, the purchase together with turmoil in the market put financial strain on Theakston, leading eventually to the company being taken over, and the closure of the Carlisle Brewery in 1984 by Blackburn based brewer, Matthew Brown & Co Ltd. Matthew Brown was itself taken over by Scottish & Newcastle in 1987.

Following this takeover, the brewing of some Theakston beers, including Theakston Best Bitter, was transferred to Scottish & Newcastle's Tyne Brewery.

In 2003, the business returned to family control after Simon Theakston (who joined the company in 1981), along with his three Theakston brothers, all direct descendants of the founder, purchased a majority shareholding back from Scottish & Newcastle. Major development works at the Masham Brewery in 2005 enabled the company to announce that brewing of Theakston Best Bitter would return to Masham in 2009.

Beers

The company produces cask and bottled ales. Theakston cask ales are widely available in pubs in the north of England, though are less common in other parts of the country. The bottled beers are also widely distributed to British supermarkets and exported to nearly 20 countries including Italy, Australia and New Zealand.

The company produces eight permanent beers and a range of well established seasonal ales. Permanent ales include:

Summit (4.2% ABV) - A cask-conditioned pale ale designed to be served at a cooler temperature of 6-8°C.

Barista Stout (4.2% ABV) - A nitrogen infused coffee flavoured stout with caramel and vanilla flavours, hints of dark berry and a freshly roasted espresso aroma.

Pale (4.5% ABV) – A hop-forward, cold filtered and unpasteurised pale ale with notes of grapefruit and tangerine.

Best Bitter (3.8% ABV) is regularly paired with XB in pubs, Theakston Best Bitter is the company's most easily found product, served in many pubs, mainly in the north of England. It was awarded First Prize in the 1910 London Brewers Exhibition, in competition with beers from across the country.

XB (4.5% ABV) is a premium strength Bitter with a more complex flavour. Launched in 1982, it was recently brought back after a two year production halt during the pandemic.

Mild (3.5% ABV) is a dry Dark Mild, which is now one of the last remaining nationally available Mild beer brands. It was recently relaunched in cask form due to increased customer demand for traditional brewing styles.

Lightfoot (4.1% ABV) originally brewed as a seasonal blonde ale, but with its high popularity has become a regular Theakston brew. Golden in colour and bitter in taste.

Old Peculier (5.6% ABV), an old ale, is Theakston’s most famous beer. Old Peculier has been made under this name since the early 1800s. In 1989, the cask version of Old Peculier was voted Champion Strong Ale of Britain at the Great British Beer Festival. In 2000, the beer won the silver medal in the Campaign for Real Ale (CAMRA)’s Champion Winter Beer of Britain competition. Old Peculier was also voted Champion of Champions in the 2007 Yorkshire Beer Championship.

The label on the bottled version of the beer describes it as a "full bodied, rich, smooth tasting ale with a mysterious and distinctive flavour". It is named after the peculier of Masham, a peculier being a parish outside the jurisdiction of a diocese. In 1985, The Economist dubbed it the "doyen of real ales".

In 2022, Theakston launched Paradise Gold Dry Vintage Cider (6.8% ABV), a tribute to its original cider that was developed almost half a century ago.

Visitor centre
The brewery runs a visitor centre at its home in Masham where guided tours are given about the actual working brewery. Visitors are invited to hear about Theakston’s long history, finding out how it selects its ingredients and learning about the methods that the brewery uses to produce its distinctive ales.

At the end of the tour, visitors are given tokens that can be exchanged for drinks at the bar of the Black Bull in Paradise, named after the original pub (Black Bull) and the location of the new brewery (Paradise Fields).

There is also a shop, selling bottles and cans of Theakston’s core and seasonal ales, beer glasses, T-shirts and an assortment of other souvenirs.

Private tours are also offered on request.

Theakston Cooperage 
Theakston boasts one of the last remaining full-time brewery coopers in the country. Its current cooper, Euan Findlay, hand crafts a population of oak casks for the transportation of Old Peculier, the brewery’s most famous beer, enabling licensees in the north of England to provide beer served from the wood to their customers. 

A cooper’s apprenticeship lasts four years and is marked by a ‘Trussing-In’ ceremony on completion. Euan’s ‘Trussing-In’ ceremony was held in October 2021, marking the first time that such a ceremony had been held in over 20 years.

Theakston Old Peculier Crime Writing Festival 
Theakston is the inaugural title sponsor of the Old Peculier Crime Writing Festival and sponsors of the Theakston Old Peculier Crime Novel of the Year award. Established in 2004, the festival is considered to be the largest of its kind in the world and annually attracts the world’s leading crime authors. 

Held in Harrogate, a town close to the Theakston Brewery, in July each year, the festival has welcomed, among many others: John Grisham, Lee Child, Michael Connelly, PD James, Ruth Rendall, Colin Dexter, Reginald Hill, Val McDermid, Kathy Reichs, Jed Mercurio and Lynda La Plante.

See also 
 British regional breweries using wooden casks

References

External links 
 
 RateBeer

British companies established in 1827
Breweries in Yorkshire
Companies based in the Borough of Harrogate
Food and drink companies established in 1827
1827 establishments in England
Masham